Womai is an online grocery company. It was founded in 2008. It is headquartered in Beijing, China. It is a wholly owned subsidiary of the COFCO Group.

In 2016, Fortune Magazine listed the company as #170 on its Unicorn List of private companies with valuations of at least US$1 Billion.

References

Further reading

External links 
 Official website

COFCO Group
Online retailers of China
Online grocers
2008 establishments in China
Chinese companies established in 2008
Companies based in Beijing